Mount Alu is a volcano located on the eastern tip of island town of Lugus,  in the province of Sulu in the southernmost Philippines.

The Philippine Institute of Volcanology and Seismology (Phivolcs) classifies Mount Alu as Inactive.

References

See also
List of inactive volcanoes in the Philippines
List of volcanoes in the Philippines
Pacific ring of fire
Volcano
Sulu
Autonomous Region in Muslim Mindanao
Mindanao

Volcanoes of Mindanao
Inactive volcanoes of the Philippines
Landforms of Sulu
Stratovolcanoes of the Philippines